The 1991 Virginia Cavaliers men's soccer team represented the University of Virginia during the 1991 NCAA Division I men's soccer season. It was the program's 52nd season of existence, and their 38th season in the Atlantic Coast Conference.

The season saw Virginia win their second NCAA Division I Men's Soccer Championship, and their first outright championship. The title, sparked a three-year run where they would win the title three more times in what was considered a college soccer dynasty. Additionally, the Cavaliers won their second-ever ACC Men's Soccer Tournament and their 10th ACC regular season title.

The 1991 was the final season the Cavaliers played at Scott Stadium. The following year, they moved to 8,000-seat Klöckner Stadium.

The program boasted several  notable future players and coaches including Clint Peay and Claudio Reyna who collectively won over 100 caps for the United States men's national soccer team.

Squad 
The following players played for Virginia's soccer team in 1991.

Schedule 

Source:

|-
!colspan=6 style=""| Regular season

|-
!colspan=6 style=""| ACC Tournament

|-
!colspan=6 style=""| NCAA Tournament

References

External links 
Virginia Soccer

Virginia Cavaliers men's soccer seasons
Virginia Cavaliers
Virginia Soccer, men's
NCAA Division I Men's Soccer Tournament-winning seasons
NCAA Division I Men's Soccer Tournament College Cup seasons
Virginia Cavaliers
Virginia
1991